Jackson Hill is a summit located in Central New York Region of New York located in the Town of Boonville in Oneida County, south of Boonville.

References

Mountains of Oneida County, New York
Mountains of New York (state)